The Coalition Provisional Authority Program Review Board was composed of the senior personnel of the Coalition Provisional Authority, charged with the responsibility to review and make recommendations about the awarding of contracts to the administrator of the authority, Paul Bremer.

The board recommended the awarding of more than 800 contracts.

It had the authority to recommend expenditures from both the Development Fund for Iraq, which the Coalition Provisional Authority (CPA) administered in trust on behalf of the Iraqi people, and the Iraq Relief and Reconstruction Fund, which the CPA administered on behalf of the American people.

The expenditures from the Development Fund for Iraq that the board recommended to CPA Administrator Bremer were made under obligations the Coalition undertook under United Nations resolution 1483.  They included making sure that
expenditures were administered in an open and transparent manner.

According to the KPMG audit of the Development Fund for Iraq expenditures, the board routinely failed to properly document its decisions.

Voting members of the Program Review Board 

George Wolfe Chairman/Director Office of Management and Budget
Hazim Al Said Iraq Ministry of Finance
Chris Milligan USAID
Victoria Wayne Director, Office of Operations & Infrastructure
Dean Pittman Governance
Neil Mules Representative of the Australian Government
William Block Economic and Development Policy
Neil Hawkins Council for International Cooperation
Behnam Puttrus Iraq Ministry of Planning and Development Cooperation
Fred Smith Deputy Senior Advisor for the Office of Security Affairs
Teddy Bryan USAID
Col Frank Boynton Director, Office of Operations & Infrastructure
COL William Ford Coalition Joint Task Force – 7, Comptroller
Yusaf Samiullah Representative of the United Kingdom Government
Chris Soares Economic and Development Policy
Dr. Edgar Rodrigo Iraq Ministry of Planning and Development Cooperation
Lt Col Jim Reitzel Coalition Joint Task Force – 7, Comptroller
Lindy Cameron Representative of the United Kingdom Government
Frederick C. Smith Deputy Senior Advisor for the Office of Security Affairs
Christopher Segar Representative of the United Kingdom Government
Heidi Venamore Representative of the Australian Government 
Maj Todd Gondeck Coalition Joint Task Force – 7, Comptroller
Rodney Bent Chairman/Director Office of Management and Budget

Minutes 

None of the minutes is complete. Many are missing.

In some cases the minutes did not include an attendance list.  When an attendance list was present, the roles and titles of the attendees was not always provided.

Only rarely did the minutes record whether the attendees had reviewed and approved the minutes of the previous meeting, or the date of the next meeting.

The minutes seldom recorded the wording of motions, who seconded them, who voted for them or against them, or even the vote tally.

In some cases where an attendance list was part of the minutes, decisions were made when the board did not have quorum.

The KPMG audit of the Development Fund for Iraq notes that of the minutes of the 43 Program Review Board meetings it was able to review, all from 2003, just two were attended by the Iraqi member.  The list of minutes available on the board's Web site lists 34 meetings in that year.
June 7, 2003 (.pdf) 
June 8, 2003 (.pdf) Additional notes to the meeting of June 6 .
June 21, 2003 (.pdf) 
June 25, 2003 (.pdf)
July 5, 2003 (.pdf)
July 8, 2003 (.pdf)
July 12, 2003 (.pdf)
July 15, 2003 (.pdf)
July 27, 2003 (.pdf)
July 29, 2003 (.pdf)
August 12, 2003
September 1, 2003
September 2, 2003
September 7, 2003 (.pdf)
September 9, 2003 (.pdf)
September 13, 2003 (.pdf)
October 7, 2003 (.doc)
October 8, 2003
October 11, 2003
October 18, 2003
October 21, 2003
October 25, 2003
October 28, 2003
November 1, 2003
November 8, 2003
November 11, 2003
November 15, 2003
November 22, 2003
November 29, 2003
December 2, 2003
December 6, 2003
December 14, 2003
December 20, 2003
December 29, 2003
January 3, 2004
January 10, 2004
January 17, 2004
January 24, 2004
January 31, 2004
February 8, 2004
February 15, 2004
February 24, 2004
March 6, 2004
March 10, 2004
March 29, 2004
April 7, 2004
April 14, 2004
April 28, 2004
May 12, 2004
May 15, 2004
June 2, 2004

External links
The audit report s of the Development Fund for Iraq
notes on the absence of the CPA's internal audit controls (.pdf)

Review Board